Golyam Perelik is the highest peak in the Rhodope Mountains, situated 19 km to the west of Smolyan. It makes the Rhodopes the seventh highest Bulgarian mountain range after Rila, Pirin, Stara Planina, Vitosha, Osogovo and Slavyanka. The peak is easily accessible, but currently cannot be climbed because a unit of the Bulgarian Army is stationed in its vicinity.

Perelik Point on Robert Island, South Shetland Islands is named after Golyam Perelik.

External links 
 A guideline of the Bulgarian mountains - The highest peaks (in Bulgarian)

Rhodope Mountains
Mountains of Bulgaria
Landforms of Smolyan Province
Two-thousanders of Bulgaria